Abby Allan is a former association football player who represented New Zealand at international level.

Allan made her Football Ferns début in a 0–1 loss to Bulgaria on 24 August 1994, and finished her international career with six caps to her credit.
She went on to play in the United States on a full scholarship to Fairfield University where she still holds the all-time scoring record, was voted to All-America team and inducted into the Fairfield University Hall of Fame. #15

References

Year of birth missing (living people)
Fairfield University alumni
Living people
New Zealand women's association footballers
New Zealand women's international footballers
Women's association football forwards
Fairfield Stags women's soccer players
New Zealand expatriate sportspeople in the United States